The SIG Sauer SSG 3000 (Scharfschützengewehr 3000, literally Sharpshooter Rifle 3000) is a bolt-action, magazine fed rifle chambered in 7.62×51mm NATO. It was developed in Germany. It is a common law enforcement sniper rifle in both Europe and the United States. The SSG 3000 was developed by SIG Sauer GmbH and is well renowned for its high quality.

Specifications 
The rifle comes in two barrel lengths, either 46 or 60 cm (18 or 23.5 inches). The Patrol models action is imported from Germany and mated to a USA made stock by SIG Sauer, NH. The SSG 3000 typically sold in the United States is known for having two stock options. The first stock was created by McMillan USA and is a robust fiberglass aluminum design. The second stock design is an aluminum bedded composite stock, of an OEM design.

Regardless of the country of final assembly, the SIG 3000 has the uncommon feature of a quick change barrel system. The barrel can be replaced in under 15 minutes by removing the stock and three screws using a 5 mm hex key, and then properly reinserting the new barrel and screws. There are several vendors that make drop-in replacement barrels in 6mm Creedmoor, 6.5mm Creedmoor, .260 Remington (6.5-08 A-Square), 6.5×55mm, .308 Winchester, and other cartridges based on the 7.62×51mm NATO cartridge standard.

Users

: Used by Grupo Albatros
: Used by PMDF BOPE unit, naval infantry and Special Operations Brigade
: Used by Army of Chile
 Used by People's Armed Police

 : Used by Police of the Czech Republic
: Used by Unit 777
: Used by the National Civil Police.
: Used by Special Duties Unit
: Used by Indian Armed Forces.
: Supplied to the Latvian National Guard.
:  Used by Mexican Special Forces.
: Used by the Emergency Response Unit).
: Used by special forces
: Used by the Slovak Police Útvar Osobitného Určenia ("special assignments unit").
: Used by the Republic of Korea Marine Corps.
: Used by Royal Thai Army
: Used by Special Forces.

See also 
 SIG Sauer 200 STR

References

7.62×51mm NATO rifles
Bolt-action rifles
SIG Sauer rifles
Sniper rifles of Germany
Weapons and ammunition introduced in 1992